The 2017 FIBA U16 Women's European Championship Division C was the 13th edition of the Division C of the FIBA U16 Women's European Championship, the third tier of the European women's under-16 basketball championship. It was played in Gibraltar from 25 to 30 July 2017. Armenia women's national under-16 basketball team won the tournament.

Participating teams

First round

Group A

Group B

5th–7th place classification

Championship playoffs

Final standings

References

External links
FIBA official website

2017
2017–18 in European women's basketball
FIBA U16
FIBA
Sports competitions in Gibraltar